The Oregon Track Club (OTC) is an American running organization based in Eugene, Oregon.

History

Emerald Empire Athletic Association
Formed by Bill Bowerman, the Emerald Empire Athletic Association (EEAA) was the predecessor to the Oregon Track Club. In 1948, Bill Bowerman became the assistant track coach at the University of Oregon, in Eugene, Oregon.  In order to spur interest in running with the local community, Bowerman formed an all comers meet for grade-schoolers in 1949.  The next year the meet was expanded to include high school and college athletes. The low turnout of the all comers meet caused Bowerman to want to increase his efforts in promoting track and field in Eugene. In 1958, with the help of Ray Hendrickson and Bob Newland, Bowerman established the Emerald Empire Athletic Association.  Ralph Christensen became the first president of the EEAA, and along with the other leaders established the goals for the EEAA:

To promote youth program for youngsters in track and field.
To provide training assistance and facilities for track and field athletes of all ages.
To sponsor one big track meet each summer as a fundraising event to support the other goals.

Change to Oregon Track Club
In 1965 the Emerald Empire Athletic Association changed its name to the Oregon Track Club.  This was in part due to the leadership's desire to concentrate mainly on track and field.  Beginning in the late 1960s, the OTC started to become a dominant force in American Track and Field.  Due to the relationship between the University of Oregon and the Oregon Track Club (both in Eugene, same coaches), many athletes from the University of Oregon's strong cross country and track and field programs decided to remain in Eugene to compete with the Oregon Track Club.  The most notable of these athletes are Steve Prefontaine, who placed fourth in the 1972 Summer Olympics in the men's 5000 meters race, and Mac Wilkins, who received the gold medal in the discus throw at the 1976 Summer Olympics. During the '70s, the OTC sent dozens of athletes to the Olympics and won several medals.

Branches
The Oregon Track Club is made up of three branches: the general club, the elite club, and the masters club.

General Club

The general part of the OTC is the largest subgroup in the OTC.  It is made up of athletes under the age of 30 who pursue running for enjoyment.  Many of these runners had no or little NCAA running experience, but are still running every day and competing in organized meets because of the passion they exhibit for the sport. These members of the OTC have helped increase popularity in Track and Field in the United States.  They also helped design Hayward Field and hosted major meets such as the 2008 US Olympic Trials.

Elite
OTC Elite is the professional branch of the OTC and is based in Eugene, Oregon.  The current format of the club was created in 2006, and originally coached by Frank Gagliano.  In 2008 Mark Rowland became the Head Coach of OTC.  For a time there were three groups of athletes who wore the OTC Elite uniform, one coached by Alberto Salazar and one coached by Jerry Schumacher. Alberto Salazar went on to coach the Nike Oregon Project until he was suspended and then banned for life, while Jerry Schumacher went on to coach Nike's Bowerman Track Club. The team has had great success, culminating at the 2011 IAAF World Championships with High Jumper Jesse Williams winning Gold, Ashton Eaton winning Silver in the Decathlon, and Sally Kipyego winning Silver in the 10,000 meters.

Masters
The masters and submasters division of the OTC is a subgroup of the OTC designed for older members to stay competitive.  The masters and submasters divisions have age restrictions to provide fair competition between athletes: 40 years old and older for the masters division and 30 to 39 years old for the submasters division.  The OTC's masters division hosts the Hayward Classic, which is one of the more popular masters track meets in the country.

Youth
In 2019, the club added a youth cross-country program. This club is designed to fuel kids' excitement and love for running by giving them the opportunity to participate in this historic club and be a part of Eugene's worldwide fame as TrackTown USA. A particularly unique aspect of the program is that the youth athletes receive encouragement and coaching from OTC elite runners, Olympians, and other local celebrities.

Runners

Notable current athletes

The following athletes compete as part of the OTC Elite in Eugene:

Nijel Amos
Ben Blankenship
Tom Farrell
Hanna Green
Sally Kipyego
Hassan Mead
Francine Niyonsaba
Andrew Osagie
Luke Puskedra
Sheila Reid (athlete)

Notable former athletes

The following athletes formerly competed in the past for the Oregon Track Club:

Margaret Bailes
Wade Bell
Russell Wolf Brown
Dyrol Burleson
Sam Chelanga
Bill Dellinger
Ian Dobson
Ashton Eaton
Mo Farah
Shalane Flanagan
Cyrus Hostetler
Evan Jager
Lauren Johnson
Tyler Mulder
Ciaran O'Lionaird
Steve Prefontaine
Lachlan Renshaw
Galen Rupp
Chris Solinsky
Nick Symmonds
Alan Webb
Andrew Wheating
Mac Wilkins
Jesse Williams

Coaches

Bill Bowerman
Bill Dellinger
Frank Gagliano
Bob Newland
Mark Rowland - current OTC Elite Head Coach
Alberto Salazar (Nike Oregon Project)
Jerry Schumacher (Bowerman Track Club)

Nike relationship
The OTC has had a long-standing close relationship with Nike, Inc. over the years. This relationship is due mostly to the fact that one of Nike's founders was OTC founder Bill Bowerman.  It is also because Nike's main founder Phil Knight was a middle-distance runner for the University of Oregon and had a close relationship with many of the athletes in the OTC. Throughout the years, Nike has contributed strongly to the OTC by supplying equipment and sponsoring competitions for athletes to compete against other track clubs across the nation. This relationship has greatly increased with the re-establishment of the OTC Elite.

References

External links
 
 OTC on Runnerspace

Track and field clubs in the United States
Sports in Eugene, Oregon
Track and field in Oregon
1958 establishments in Oregon
Sports clubs established in 1958